Socialist Students is a socialist organisation with branches in universities, further education colleges and sixth form colleges in the United Kingdom. Socialist Students was established in the late 1990s by members of the Socialist Party (SP) who had built support for the Save Free Education Campaign amongst students in the battle over the introduction of fees when the Labour Party under Tony Blair was elected in 1997.

Socialist Students describes itself as a politically independent organisation, and has its own national committee meetings and annual conference at which motions are debated and voted on. Socialist Students produces the political magazine Megaphone. It is affiliated with International Socialist Resistance and takes part in campaigns such as Youth Fight for Jobs and "Hands off our Schools" against city academies. The two organisations have a joint presence on anti-war and anti-G8/climate change demonstrations, which they term the "Red Contingent". Socialist Students has been active in the recent climate change strikes.

Political programme 

The organisation is broad, with some in the ranks being members of parties other than the SP - for example the Green Party of England and Wales, Plaid Cymru, the Communist Party of Britain and Labour, with the majority being non-aligned. The structure of Socialist Students is federal, with each society or organising its own activity and campaigns as well as building national campaigns. Socialist Students aims to be a forum for students interested in socialist and Marxist ideas, while giving students experience in debating, organising and intervening in struggle.

Socialist Students links the struggles of students with that of workers. Along with ISR and the Socialist Party, Socialist Students set up the Youth Fight for Jobs campaign.

Campaign to Defeat Fees

After the National Union of Students (NUS) demonstration against fees on 29 October 2006, Socialist Students members launched the Campaign to Defeat Fees to argue for a fighting platform against tuition and top-up fees.
Prior to the campaign's first day of action, Socialist Students received a message of support from National Union of Students, a message Socialist Students welcomed but were still critical of NUS's lack of action. The first day of action on 22 February 2007 featured action taking place at over 40 Universities and Colleges, which was followed by another on 27 April 2007, alongside various meetings on this issue organised by local Socialist Student societies.
So far students from 103 different schools, colleges or universities have signed the Campaign to Defeat Fees petition.

References

External links
 Socialist Students national website

Higher education organisations based in the United Kingdom
Student politics
Socialist_Party_(England_and_Wales)
1998 establishments in the United Kingdom